Andi Maureen Sullivan (born December 20, 1995) is an American soccer player who plays for the Washington Spirit in the National Women's Soccer League and the United States women's national soccer team.

Early life
Raised in Lorton, Virginia, Sullivan is the youngest of four siblings and attended South County High School. She played club soccer for Bethesda Soccer Club (Freedom) and McLean Youth Soccer. In 2013, she was named the national Youth Player of the Year by the National Soccer Coaches Association of America (NSCAA). Top Drawer Soccer ranked her as the  top college recruit.

Stanford Cardinal, 2014–2017
During her freshman season in 2014, Sullivan started in 23 of the 24 matches in which she played. She scored her first goal for the Cardinal during a match against University of Dayton and served four assists throughout the season ranking third on the team. She made the All-Freshman First Team for Top Drawer Soccer, as well as the Pac-12 First Team and NSCAA All-Pacific Region Second Team. She was also awarded Pac-12 Freshman of the Year and named National Freshman of the Year by Top Drawer Soccer and Soccer America.

As a sophomore, Sullivan played and started in all 23 games. She scored 5 goals, including three game-winners, and provided 2 assists. As a junior, Sullivan led Stanford in points (29), goals (11) and game-winning goals (4). She was named the Pac-12 Player of the Year and earned All-Pac-12 first team honors for the third consecutive season.

As a senior, Sullivan tallied three goals and six assists and led Stanford to their second national championship, scoring in the College Cup final. She won the Hermann Trophy, after being a finalist in 2016 and a semifinalist in 2015.

Club career

Washington Spirit Reserves, 2012–2015
Sullivan played in the USL W-League during the 2012–2015 seasons. She played with D.C. United Women in 2012, which was later renamed the Washington Spirit Reserves for the 2013–2015 seasons.

Washington Spirit, 2018–present
On January 18, 2018, Sullivan was selected as the number one overall draft pick at the 2018 NWSL College Draft by the Washington Spirit. Sullivan appeared in every game for the Spirit, except for the last game of the season which she missed as she was completing in the Nordic Cup with U.S. U-23.

Sullivan was named a finalist for 2018 NWSL Rookie of the Year, she finished second in voting for the award behind winner, Imani Dorsey.

She returned to Washington for the 2019 NWSL season and was named team captain.

International career

Youth national teams 
Sullivan has represented the United States on the senior national team as well as the under-15, under-17, under-20, and under-23 national teams.
Sullivan competed for the United States at the 2012 CONCACAF Women's U-17 Championship  in Guatemala where she helped the under-17 national team win gold. Despite being the youngest player on the under-20 national team roster at the 2014 CONCACAF Women's U-20 Championship, she co-captained the team to a 2014 FIFA U-20 Women's World Cup berth.

On August 23, 2018, she was named to the United States U-23 team for the 2018 Nordic tournament.

Senior National Team
She earned her first cap with the senior national team during an international friendly match against Switzerland on October 19, 2016, and earned Player of the Match for her impressive performance. She earned her first assist a few days later on October 23, 2016. She then played in two more matches on November 10 and 13 where she earned another assist. However, she tore her ACL a few days later during a college match on November 18, 2016. She missed a large part of the year due to the injury but made her return to the national team on October 19, 2017.

Sullivan was named to the 23-player roster for the 2018 SheBelieves Cup, the U.S. won the tournament for the second time. She was on the 35-player provisional roster for the 2018 CONCACAF Women's Championship but was not named to the final 20-player roster.

In 2019, Sullivan was originally not included on the January camp roster but was added to the roster by head coach Jill Ellis. Sullivan was also named to the team for the 2019 SheBelieves Cup.

International goals

Career statistics

International

Personal life
On December 14, 2019, Sullivan married Drew Skundrich.

Honors and awards
Stanford University
 NCAA Women's Soccer Championship: 2017
United States U17
 CONCACAF Women's U-17 Championship: 2012
United States U20
 CONCACAF Women's U-20 Championship: 2014

United States
 CONCACAF Women's Championship: 2022
 CONCACAF Women's Olympic Qualifying Tournament: 2020
 SheBelieves Cup: 2018; 2020; 2022; 2023
Individual
 Pac-12 Freshman of the Year: 2014
 Hermann Trophy: 2017
 Honda Sports Award: 2017
 espnW Player of the Week: November 2016

References

Match reports

External links 
 
 Andi Sullivan profile at U.S. Soccer
 Andi Sullivan profile at Stanford

1995 births
Living people
American women's soccer players
Women's association football midfielders
Stanford Cardinal women's soccer players
United States women's international soccer players
Soccer players from Virginia
Hermann Trophy women's winners
United States women's under-20 international soccer players
Washington Spirit draft picks
Washington Spirit players
National Women's Soccer League players
Sportspeople from Fairfax County, Virginia
People from Lorton, Virginia
Soccer players from Honolulu